Glipostenoda signatella is a species of beetle in the genus Glipostenoda. It was described in 1876.

References

signatella
Beetles described in 1876